Gornaya Karusel is a sports and tourism area on the Northern slopes of Mount Aibga in Estosadok, Sochi.

Skiing area
From the launch pad in the valley bottom (540m) three new gondola type ropeways bring the tourists up to three transfer levels (960m, 1460m, 2200m).

History
The sports complex now promoted exclusively under the Russian name Gornaya Karusel (literally Mountain Circus) used to be referred to by the company name Аlpika Service (А́льпика-Се́рвис) which from 1993 on had constructed the first ski lifts for the vast skiing area on the northern slopes of Mount Aibga.

In 2008, Gazprom bought the company for a low price and started to promote the area building new ropeways and several hotel villages to host tourists coming to Krasnaya Polyana during the Olympic Games 2014.

Alpika Service was closed due to court decisions.

External links 
Official Webpage of Gornaya Karusel

Gallery

References

Ski areas and resorts in Russia
Adlersky City District
Buildings and structures in Sochi